Cox Stadium is a multi-purpose stadium on the campus of San Francisco State University in San Francisco, California.

Tenants
SFSU men's and women's soccer and track and field teams use Cox Stadium.  The school's athletic teams, called the Gators, compete in the California Collegiate Athletic Association Division II of the NCAA.  Cox Stadium also hosts the University’s annual commencement celebration.  Additionally, the stadium is open to the campus and surrounding community for recreational purposes.

References

External links
 SFSU Cox Stadium

San Francisco State Gators football
American football venues in San Francisco
Athletics (track and field) venues in San Francisco
College soccer venues in California
College track and field venues in the United States
Soccer venues in San Francisco
Sports venues in San Francisco